The 2021 Cronulla-Sutherland Sharks season was the 55th in the club's history. The club was coached by Josh Hannay in an interim role and captained by Wade Graham. The team was initially coached by John Morris, who was relinquished of his duties following the signing of Craig Fitzgibbon as coach for the 2022 NRL season. The team competed in the National Rugby League's 2021 Telstra Premiership.

Milestones 
Round 1: Aaron Woods played his 50th game for the club.
Round 1: Aiden Tolman made his debut for the club, after previously playing for the Canterbury-Bankstown Bulldogs.
Round 2: Wade Graham played his 250th career game.
Round 4: Teig Wilton scored his 1st career try.
Round 6: Braden Hamlin-Uele played his 50th career game.
Round 8: Will Chambers made his debut for the club, after previously playing for the Melbourne Storm.
Round 9: Matt Moylan played his 50th game for the club.
Round 12: Shaun Johnson played his 200th career game.
Round 12: Briton Nikora played his 50th career and club game.
Round 12: Franklin Pele made his NRL debut for the club.
Round 15: Will Chambers scored his 1st try for the club.
Round 16: Aiden Tolman scored his 1st try for the club.
Round 17: Braydon Trindall scored his 1st career try.
Round 19: Toby Rudolf scored his 1st career try.
Round 20: Luke Metcalf made his NRL debut for the club.
Round 23: Luke Metcalf scored his 1st career try.

Fixtures

Pre-season
Source:

Regular season

Source:

Ladder

Coaching staff
Source:

Josh Hannay — NRL Head Coach (Interim)
Darren Mooney — General Manager – Football
Mark Noakes — NRL Performance Operations
Nathan Pickworth — Head of Performance
Dave Howlett — NRL Assistant Coach
Paul Gallen – NRL Specialist coach
Luke Lewis – NRL Specialist coach
Daniel Holdsworth – Elite Development Coach/NRL Assistant
Tony Grimaldi — Strength and Conditioning Coach
Alex Clarke — Strength Coach
Dave Garrick – NRL Physiotherapist
Pat Williams – NRL Physiotherapist
John Davey – Sports Scientist
Marc Leabres – Performance Analyst
Luke Mace - NRL Operations
Amanda King – Education and Wellbeing
Jeff Robson – Education and Wellbeing
Glenn Brailey – Academy and Talent Identification
Dr. George Pitsis – Club Doctor

Squad

Player movements

Losses
 Bryson Goodwin to released
 Shaun Johnson to released (mid-season)
 Cameron King to Townsville Blackhawks (Intrust Super Cup)
 Nene Macdonald to Norths Devils (Intrust Super Cup) (mid-season)
 Scott Sorensen to Penrith Panthers
 Chad Townsend to New Zealand Warriors (mid-season)
 Bronson Xerri to suspended (mid-season)

Gains
 Will Chambers from Suntory Sungoliath (Top League) (mid-season)
 Jack Martin from Ipswich Jets (Hastings Deering Colts)
 Luke Metcalf from Manly-Warringah Sea Eagles
 Kai O'Donnell from Mackay Cutters (Intrust Super Cup) (mid-season)
 Aiden Tolman from Canterbury-Bankstown Bulldogs

Player Appearances

Representative honours 

 Bold denotes players who captained their respective teams.
 (ToS) - Train on Squad

1 – Ronaldo Mulitalo was originally set to make his debut for the Queensland Maroons but was found to be ineligible despite having played representative rugby league for Queensland's under 18s and under 20s sides.

Squad statistics 
Statistics Source:

NSWRL Major Comps

Knock-On Effect NSW Cup (Newtown Jets)

Pre-season

Source:

Regular season

Source:

Jersey Flegg Cup (U21s)

Regular season

Source:

Harvey Norman Women's Premiership

Regular season

Source:

The Sharks were originally set to compete in the Harvey Norman Women's Premiership finals series. Due to the COVID lockdown situation in Sydney as well as surrounding areas, the NSWRL made the decision to cancel qualifying matches and head straight to a grand final, eliminating the Sharks from the competition.

NSWRL Junior Reps

SG Ball Cup (U19s)

Regular season

Source:

Harold Matthews Cup (U17s)

Regular season

Source:

Tarsha Gale Cup (U19s)

Regular season

Source:

Finals series

References

Cronulla-Sutherland Sharks
Cronulla-Sutherland Sharks seasons